Cecil Lauriston Kellaway (22 August 1890 – 28 February 1973) was a South African character actor. He was nominated for the Academy Award for Best Supporting Actor twice, for The Luck of the Irish (1948) and Guess Who's Coming to Dinner (1967).

Early life
Cecil Kellaway was born on 22 August 1890 in Cape Town, South Africa. He was the son of English parents, Rebecca Annie (née Brebner) and Edwin John Kellaway, an architect and engineer. Edwin had immigrated to Cape Town to help build the Houses of Parliament there, and he was a good friend of Cecil Rhodes, who was young Cecil's eponym and godfather.

Cecil was interested in acting from an early age. He was educated at the Normal College, Cape Town, and in England at Bradford Grammar School. He studied engineering and on his return to South Africa was employed in an engineering firm. However the lure of acting was too strong and he became a full-time actor, making his debut in Potash and Perlmutter.  Early plays included The Prince of Pilsen. 

He briefly served in the army in 1914 but was invalided out. 

He toured for three years through China, Japan, Siam, Borneo, Malaya, North and South Africa, and Europe, in plays such as Monsieur Beaucaire.

Australia

Australian theatre
Kellaway arrived in Australia in 1921 under contract to J. C. Williamson Ltd.  He had a notable success as the comic father of four daughters in A Night Out which he played through most of 1922; he would often return to this role in later years and it kicked off a sixteen year association with Williamsons on the Australian stage, mostly in musical comedies. 

For Williamsons he was in Mary (1922–23) then returned to A Night Out before going on to The Cabaret Girl (1923–24), Kissing Time (1924), Whirled into Happiness (1924), Katja (1925), The Belle of New York (1925), Primrose (1925), A Night Out revival (1926), Frasquita (1927), Princess Charming (1928), Hold Everything (1929), Florodora (1931), A Warm Corner (1931), A Night Out again, Sons o' Guns (1931), Blue Roses (1932), Hold my Hand (1932), The Gipsy Princess (1933), and Waltzes from Vienna (1936).

Australian films
By the early 1930s Kellaway was one of the biggest stars in Australian theatre. He made his film debut in the lead of The Hayseeds (1933), a popular local comedy, directed by Beaumont Smith. However his main focus was still the stage: The Dubarry (1934), Music in the Air (1934), Roberta (1935), High Jinks (1935), Ball at the Savoy (1935), A Southern Maid (1936) and White Horse Inn (1936).

He returned to films with the Australian Cinesound film It Isn't Done (1937), for which he also provided the original story. Directed by Ken G. Hall it was a popular success. It led to Kellaway being screen-tested by RKO Pictures and put under contract.

He appeared in A Southern Maid on stage in 1937.

Hollywood

RKO
RKO initially put Kellaway into small roles: Everybody's Doing It (1938), Double Danger (1938), Night Spot (1938), Maid's Night Out (1938), This Marriage Business (1938), and Law of the Underworld (1938). Kellaway was first given a sizeable role, billed third for Blond Cheat (1938), with Joan Fontaine. However his parts remained small: Smashing the Rackets (1938), Tarnished Angel (1938), Annabel Takes a Tour (1938), and Gunga Din (1939).

Return to Australia
Kellaway returned to Australia for a second Cinesound film, Mr. Chedworth Steps Out (1939), which featured a young Peter Finch. It was shot in October–November 1938.

Return to Hollywood
Back in Hollywood the scope and quality of his roles kept getting better, with Wuthering Heights (1939), for William Wyler, as Cathy's father.

He was in The Sun Never Sets (1939), Man About Town (1939) at Paramount, and The Under-Pup (1939).

He turned down The Private Lives of Elizabeth and Essex (1939) to do Intermezzo (1939) for David O. Selznick. He later made We Are Not Alone (1939).

He was in Mexican Spitfire (1940) at RKO, The Invisible Man Returns (1940) and The House of the Seven Gables (1940) at Universal, Adventure in Diamonds (1940), Phantom Raiders (1940), Brother Orchid (1940), Pop Always Pays (1940), The Mummy's Hand (1940), Diamond Frontier (1940), and Mexican Spitfire Out West (1940) at RKO. 
He turned down Balalaika to do The Letter (1940) for Wyler.

Kellaway was in South of Suez (1940) at Warners, and Lady with Red Hair (1940). He received billing in The Letter (1940), but is only glimpsed briefly in a party scene, his role having been cut.

Paramount
Kellaway made West Point Widow (1941) at Paramount and signed a contract with them. He did A Very Young Lady (1941) at Fox, Burma Convoy (1941), New York Town (1941), Birth of the Blues (1941), and Appointment for Love (1941) at Universal.

At Paramount, he was in The Night of January 16th (1941), Bahama Passage (1941), The Lady Has Plans (1941), and Take a Letter, Darling (1941). Fox borrowed him for Small Town Deb (1941), then he returned to Paramount for Are Husbands Necessary? (1942), and Night in New Orleans (1942).

Leading man and supporting roles
Kellaway had a strong part in I Married a Witch (1942) as Veronica Lake's character's father. He followed it with My Heart Belongs to Daddy (1942). Response to this was positive, and Paramount announced they would build Kellaway into a star, putting him in a remake of Ruggles of Red Gap and starring in The Incomparable Alfred.

He had cameos in Star Spangled Rhythm (1943) and Forever and a Day (1943), and was in The Crystal Ball (1943), and It Ain't Hay (1943).

Paramount gave him the starring role in The Good Fellows (1943). He returned to support parts for Frenchman's Creek (1944). He was going to do Out of This World on Broadway when he was offered the role of Edward VII in Mrs. Parkington (1944) at Metro-Goldwyn-Mayer.

Back at Paramount, he was in And Now Tomorrow (1944), Practically Yours (1944), and Love Letters (1945), the latter also starring Kellaways's one-time Australian co-star Ann Richards.

In Kitty (1945), he was as painter Thomas Gainsborough. MGM borrowed him to play the ill-fated husband of Lana Turner's character in The Postman Always Rings Twice (1946), a support role in Easy to Wed (1946) and the villain in The Cockeyed Miracle (1946).

In early 1946, he was earning $1,500 a week but said he was considering returning to Australia to run a film studio because he was sick of playing small roles.

Back at Paramount he was in Monsieur Beaucaire (1946), Variety Girl (1947), and Unconquered (1947).

Kellaway was borrowed by Warners for Always Together (1947) then he went to 20th Century Fox for The Luck of the Irish (1948), which earned him an Oscar nomination.

Kellaway went to RKO for Joan of Arc (1948).

Kellaway was in The Decision of Christopher Blake (1948), Portrait of Jennie (1948), Down to the Sea in Ships (1949), The Reformer and the Redhead (1950), back at MGM.

In 1950, it was announced James Hilton was writing a script as a vehicle for Kellaway, Roof of the World, based on the actor's time in India. It was not made.

He was in Harvey (1950), Kim (1950), Katie Did It (1951), Francis Goes to the Races (1951), Half Angel (1951), and The Highwayman (1951).

He returned to Paramount for Thunder in the East (1952) and was in Just Across the Street (1952), My Wife's Best Friend (1952), Young Bess (1953), The Beast from 20,000 Fathoms (1953), Cruisin' Down the River (1953), and Paris Model (1953).

In 1954, he became an American citizen (his nationality had been South African).

At MGM he was in The Prodigal (1955) and Interrupted Melody (1955), playing an Australian in the latter (the father of Marjorie Lawrence). He did two with Jeff Chandler, Female on the Beach (1955) and The Toy Tiger (1956) and was billed second (to Ethel Barrymore) in Johnny Trouble (1957).

He worked regularly on television in shows like Lux Video Theatre, The Ford Television Theatre, Schlitz Playhouse, Cavalcade of America, Schlitz Playhouse, Playhouse 90, Studio One in Hollywood, Matinee Theatre, and Crossroads.

Kellaway was in The Proud Rebel (1958), The Shaggy Dog (1959), and The Private Lives of Adam and Eve (1960).

He appeared on Broadway in Greenwillow (1960) which had a short run.

On American television, he made a guest appearance in 1959 on Perry Mason as chemist and murderer Darrell Metcalf in "The Case of the Glittering Goldfish", and he received a billing credit in that episode equal to Raymond Burr's.

Kellaway then guest-starred two years later on CBS's Western series Rawhide, portraying the character MacKay in the episode "Incident in the Middle of Nowhere"..

In 1954 he guest starred as "old codger" Kirby in Episode 24 on the second season of the television show Make Room for Daddy, later renamed The Danny Thomas Show.

He was also in Whirlybirds, The Millionaire, The Ann Sothern Show, Destination Space, Harrigan and Son, Hennesey, Johnny Ringo, The Twilight Zone, The New Breed, Adventures in Paradise, Mr. Smith Goes to Washington (TV series), Follow the Sun and Ben Casey.

Kellaway was in Francis of Assisi (1961), Tammy Tell Me True (1961), Zotz! (1962), The Cardinal (1963), Hush… Hush, Sweet Charlotte (1964), and Quick, Let's Get Married (1964).

In 1963 he guest starred as museum curator Wilbur Canfield in Episode 19 on the first season of the television show My Favorite Martian. In 1964 he played Santa Claus in the "Visions of Sugarplums" episode of Bewitched. In 1967, Kellaway played the part of a lonely, megawealthy much older suitor of Ann Marie (played by Marlo Thomas) in an episode of That Girl. Other TV appearances included Valentine's Day, Burke's Law, The F.B.I., and The Greatest Show on Earth.

Later work
Kellaway's last films included Spinout (1966), The Adventures of Bullwhip Griffin (1967) and Guess Who's Coming to Dinner (1967), which earned him another Oscar nomination.

He appeared in episodes of The Ghost & Mrs. Muir and Nanny and the Professor and the TV version of Kismet (1967).

His final performances included Fitzwilly (1969), Getting Straight (1970), The Wacky Zoo of Morgan City (1971) and a pilot for a TV series, Call Holme (1971).

Complete filmography

Bond and Word (1918)
The Hayseeds (1933) as Dad Hayseed 
It Isn't Done (1937) as Hubert Blaydon; also based on Kellaway's original story
Wise Girl (1937) as Fletcher's Butler (unconfirmed)
Everybody's Doing It (1938) as Mr. Beyers
Double Danger (1938) as Fetrisss / Gilhooley
Night Spot (1938) as Willard Lorryweather
Maid's Night Out (1938) as Geoffrey
This Marriage Business (1938) as Police Chief Hardy
Law of the Underworld (1938) as Phillips – Gene's Butler (uncredited)
Blond Cheat (1938) as Rufus Trent
Smashing the Rackets (1938) as Barrett (uncredited)
Tarnished Angel (1938) as Reginald 'Reggie' Roland
Annabel Takes a Tour (1938) as Strothers, River-Clyde's Publisher (uncredited)
Gunga Din (1939) as Mr. Stebbins (uncredited)
Wuthering Heights (1939) as Earnshaw 
Mr. Chedworth Steps Out (1939) as George Chedworth
The Sun Never Sets  (1939) as Colonial Official
Man About Town (1939) as Headwaiter (uncredited)
The Under-Pup (1939) as Mr. Wendelhares (uncredited)
Intermezzo (1939) as Charles Moler
We Are Not Alone (1939) as Judge 
Mexican Spitfire (1940) as Mr. Chumley
The Invisible Man Returns (1940) as Inspector Sampson
The House of the Seven Gables (1940) as Philip Barton
Adventure in Diamonds (1940) as Emerson
Phantom Raiders (1940) as Franklin Morris
Brother Orchid (1940) as Brother Goodwin
Pop Always Pays (1940) (scenes cut)
The Mummy's Hand (1940) as The Great Solvani
Diamond Frontier (1940) as Noah
Mexican Spitfire Out West (1940) as Mr. Chumley
The Letter (1940) as Prescott
South of Suez (1940) as Henry Putnam
Lady with Red Hair (1940) as Mr. Chapman
West Point Widow (1941) as Dr. Spencer
A Very Young Lady (1941) as Professor Starkweather
Burma Convoy (1941) as Angus McBragel
New York Town (1941) as Shipboard Host
Birth of the Blues (1941) as Granet
Appointment for Love (1941) as O'Leary
The Night of January 16th (1941) as Oscar
Bahama Passage (1941) as Captain Jack Risingwell
The Lady Has Plans (1942) as Peter Miles 
Take a Letter, Darling (1942) as Uncle George
Small Town Deb (1941) as Henry Randall
Are Husbands Necessary? (1942) as Dr. Buell
Night in New Orleans (1942) as Dan Odell
I Married a Witch (1942) as Daniel
My Heart Belongs to Daddy (1942) as Alfred Fortescue
Star Spangled Rhythm (1942) as Cecil Kellaway (uncredited)
Freedom Comes High (1943, Short) as Ellen's Father
Forever and a Day (1943) as Dinner Guest
The Crystal Ball (1943) as Pop Tibbets
It Ain't Hay (1943) as King O'Hara
The Good Fellows (1943) as Jim Hilton
Showboat Serenade (1944, Short) as Colonel Jordan
Frenchman's Creek (1944) as William
Mrs Parkington (1944) as Edward, Prince of Wales
And Now Tomorrow (1944) as Dr. Weeks 
Practically Yours (1944) as Marvin P. Meglin
Love Letters (1945) as Mac
Kitty (1945) as Thomas Gainsborough
The Postman Always Rings Twice (1946) as Nick Smith
Easy to Wed (1946) as J. B. Allenbury 
Monsieur Beaucaire (1946) as Count D'Armand
The Cockeyed Miracle (1946) as Tony Carter
Variety Girl (1947) as Cecil Kellaway
Unconquered (1947) as Jeremy Love
Always Together (1947) as Jonathan Turner
The Luck of the Irish (1948) as Horace 
Joan of Arc (1948) as Jean Le Maistre – Inquisitor of Rouen
The Decision of Christopher Blake (1948) as Judge Alexander Adamson
Portrait of Jennie (1948) as Matthews
Down to the Sea in Ships (1949) as Slush Tubbs
The Reformer and the Redhead (1950) as Doctor Kevin G. Maguire
Harvey (1950) as Dr. Chumley 
Kim (1950) as Hurree Chunder
Katie Did It (1951) as Nathaniel B. Wakeley VI
Francis Goes to the Races (1951) as Colonel Travers
Half Angel (1951) as Harry Gilpin
The Highwayman (1951) as Lord Herbert
Thunder in the East (1952) as Dr. Willoughby
Just Across the Street (1952) as Pop Smith
My Wife's Best Friend (1952) as Rev. Thomas Chamberlain
Young Bess (1953) as Mr. Parry
The Beast from 20,000 Fathoms (1953) as Dr. Thurgood Elson
Cruisin' Down the River (1953) as Thadeus Jackson
Paris Model (1953) as Patrick J. "P. J." Sullivan
The Prodigal (1955) as Governor
Interrupted Melody (1955) as Bill Lawrence
Female on the Beach (1955) as Osbert Sorenson
The Toy Tiger (1956) as James Fusenot
Johnny Trouble (1957) as Tom McKay
The Proud Rebel (1958) as Doctor Enos Davis
Destination Space (1959 TV movie) as Dr. A. A. Andrews
The Shaggy Dog (1959) as Professor Plumcutt
The Private Lives of Adam and Eve (1960) as Doc Bayles
Francis of Assisi (1961) as Cardinal Hugolino
Tammy Tell Me True (1961) as Captain Joe
Zotz! (1962) as Dean Joshua Updike
The Cardinal (1963) as Monsignor Monaghan 
Hush...Hush, Sweet Charlotte (1964) as Harry Willis
Quick, Let's Get Married (1964) as The Bishop 
Spinout (1966) as Bernard Ranley
The Adventures of Bullwhip Griffin (1967) as Mr. Pemberton
Kismet (1967 TV movie)
Guess Who's Coming to Dinner (1967) as Monsignor Mike Ryan
Fitzwilly (1967) as Buckmaster
Getting Straight (1970) as Doctor Kasper
Call Holme (1972 TV movie) as Lord Basil Hyde-Smith

Select theatre credits

Potash and Perlmutter – South Africa
The Prince of Pilsen – South Africa
The Little Whopper (1921)
Monseuir Beaucaire (1917) – toured India and Africa
A Night Out (Jan-Sept 1922) – Melbourne, Sydney, Adelaide
Mary (Oct 1922 – April 1923) – Melbourne, Brisbane, Sydney
A Night Out (April 1923) – Sydney
The Cabaret Girl (Aug 1923 – March 1924)
Kissing Time (May 1924) – Melbourne
Whirled into Happiness (June–July 1924) – Melbourne
Katja (December 1925) – Sydney
The Belle of New York
Primrose (August 1925) – Sydney
Frasquita (April 1927) – Sydney
Princess Charming (July 1928) – Brisbane
Hold Everything (July 1929)
Florodora (1931)
A Warm Corner (Sept 1931)
Sons o' Guns (1931)
Blue Roses (April–August 1932) – Melbourne, Sydney, Brisbane, Adelaide, Wellington, Auckland
Hold my Hand (October 1932) – Her Majesty's Theatre, Sydney
The Gipsy Princess
The Dubarry (July 1934) – Theatre Royal, Adelaide
Music in the Air (July 1934) – Theatre Royal, Adelaide
Roberta (Marc 1935) – Theatre Royal, Sydney
High Jinks (May 1935) – Theatre Royal, Sydney
Ball at the Savoy (July 1935) – Adelaide
A Southern Maid (1937)
The Merry Widow – with Gladys Moncrieff

References

References

External links

 
 
 
 
 

1890 births
1973 deaths
Burials at Westwood Village Memorial Park Cemetery
Male actors from Cape Town
South African male film actors
South African male stage actors
South African male television actors
South African people of English descent
20th-century South African male actors
South African emigrants to the United States
RKO Pictures contract players
Paramount Pictures contract players